New York's 35th State Assembly district is one of the 150 districts in the New York State Assembly. It has been represented by Jeffrion L. Aubry since 1992.

Geography 
District 35 is located in Queens. It contains the neighborhoods of East Elmhurst, LeFrak City, and parts of Corona, Elmhurst, and Rego Park. LaGuardia Airport is part of this district.

Recent election results

2022

2020

2018

2016

2014

2012

2010

References

35
Queens, New York